Heather Wallace (born December 4, 1961 in Kitwe, Zambia) is a former professional female squash player who represented Scotland and Canada during her career. She reached a career-high world ranking of World No. 6 in July 1993.

She represented Scotland during 1981 Women's World Team Squash Championships.

References

External links
 

1961 births
Living people
Pan American Games gold medalists for Canada
Pan American Games medalists in squash
Squash players at the 1995 Pan American Games
Canadian people of Scottish descent
Canadian people of Zambian descent
Canadian female squash players
Scottish female squash players
Medalists at the 1995 Pan American Games